Sleeping Bee is an album by American jazz pianist Billy Taylor which was recorded in 1969 and originally released on the MPS label in Europe and re-released on the Prestige label in the US as Billy Taylor Today.

Reception

Allmusic awarded the album 4 stars stating "The enjoyable music swings and fits perfectly into the jazz mainstream of the era".

Track listing
All compositions by Billy Taylor except as indicated
 "La Petite Mambo" (Erroll Garner) - 4:47 	
 "Theodora" - 5:43
 "Paraphrase" - 4:21
 "Bye Y'all" - 5:13
 "Don't Go Down South" - 3:28
 "Brother, Where Are You?" (Oscar Brown) - 5:33
 "There Will Never Be Another You" (Harry Warren, Mack Gordon) - 8:24 	
 "A Sleepin' Bee" (Harold Arlen, Truman Capote) - 5:28

Personnel 
Billy Taylor – piano 
Ben Tucker – bass
Grady Tate – drums

References 

1969 albums
Billy Taylor albums
MPS Records albums
Prestige Records albums